The Guards Corps/GK was a corps level command of the Prussian and then the Imperial German Armies from the 19th century to World War I.

The Corps was headquartered in Berlin, with its units garrisoned in the city and nearby towns (Potsdam, Jüterbog, Döberitz). Unlike all other Corps of the Imperial German Army, the Guards Corps did not recruit from a specific area, but from throughout Prussia and the "Imperial Lands" of Alsace-Lorraine.

The Corps served in the Austro-Prussian War. During the Franco-Prussian War it was assigned to the 2nd Army.

In peacetime the Corps was assigned to the II Army Inspectorate but joined the 2nd Army at the start of the First World War. It was still in existence at the end of the war in the 4th Army, Heeresgruppe Kronprinz Rupprecht, on the Western Front. The Corps was disbanded with the demobilisation of the German Army after World War I.

Austro-Prussian War 
The Guards Corps fought in the Austro-Prussian War against Austria in 1866, including the Battle of Königgrätz.

Franco-Prussian War 
The Corps served in the Franco-Prussian War against France in 1870–1871 as part of 2nd Army. It saw action in the Battle of Gravelotte, Battle of Sedan and the Siege of Paris (including the Battle of Le Bourget), among other actions.

Peacetime organisation 
The 25 peacetime Corps of the German Army (Guards, I–XXI, I–III Bavarian) had a reasonably standardised organisation. Each consisted of two divisions with usually two infantry brigades, one field artillery brigade and a cavalry brigade each. Each brigade normally consisted of two regiments of the appropriate type, so each Corps normally commanded eight infantry, four field artillery and four cavalry regiments. There were exceptions to this rule:

 V, VI, VII, IX and XIV Corps each had a fifth infantry brigade (so 10 infantry regiments)
 II, XIII, XVIII and XXI Corps had a ninth infantry regiment
 I, VI and XVI Corps had a 3rd cavalry brigade (so six cavalry regiments)

Each Corps also directly controlled a number of other units. This could include one or more

 Foot Artillery Regiment
 Jäger Battalion
 Pioneer Battalion
 Train Battalion

The Guards Corps was considerably above this norm, with 11 infantry regiments (in five brigades) and 8 cavalry regiments (in four brigades). In addition to the normal two infantry divisions (1st Guards Infantry and 2nd Guards Infantry Divisions), the Guards Corps also commanded the Guards Cavalry Division, the only peacetime cavalry division in the German Army. It also incorporated an exceptional number of "Corps Troops" units, in particular school and demonstration (Lehr) units.

World War I

Organisation on mobilisation 
On mobilization on 2 August 1914 the Corps was extensively restructured. The Guards Cavalry Division (less the 4th Guards Cavalry Brigade) was assigned to the I Cavalry Corps (Höhere Kavallerie-Kommando 1); the 4th Guards Cavalry Brigade was broken up and its regiments assigned to the divisions as reconnaissance units. The Lehr Infantry Battalion was expanded to form the Lehr Infantry Regiment. It formed 6th Guards Infantry Brigade (with the Guards Füsilier Regiment) and together with the 5th Guards Infantry Brigade formed the 3rd Guards Division of the Guards Reserve Corps. Divisions received engineer companies and other support units from the Corps headquarters.

In summary, the Guards Corps mobilised with 26 infantry battalions, 10 machine gun companies (60 machine guns), eight cavalry squadrons, 24 field artillery batteries (144 guns), four heavy artillery batteries (16 guns), three pioneer companies and an aviation detachment.

Combat chronicle 
On mobilisation, the Guards Corps was assigned to the 2nd Army as part of the right wing of the forces that invaded France and Belgium as part of the Schlieffen Plan offensive in August 1914.

Soon into the war, at the First Battle of the Marne, the Prussian Guards were bitterly defeated in an attempt to take French positions.

In early July 1915 it participated in the "Battle of the Guards" near Krasnostav, acting against parts of the Russian Guard corps. It participated in the Battle of Lublin-Kholm in July 1915

In 1917, the corps was stationed on the Aisne River as part of 1st Army, and played an important role in the German defense against the French offensive in that sector.

It was still in existence at the end of the war in the 4th Army, Heeresgruppe Kronprinz Rupprecht, on the Western Front.

Commanders 
The Guards Corps had the following commanders during its existence:

See also 

Franco-Prussian War order of battle
German Army order of battle (1914)
German Army order of battle, Western Front (1918)
List of Imperial German infantry regiments
List of Imperial German artillery regiments
List of Imperial German cavalry regiments

Citations

General bibliography 
 
 
 
 
 
 
 

Corps of Germany in World War I